Pierre Camou (18 August 1945 – 15 August 2018) was a French rugby union administrator.  He was the President of the French Rugby Federation from 2008 to 2016, before he was succeeded by Bernard Laporte. Prior to becoming President of the FFR he was also the treasurer then vice-president of FIRA-AER. 

In 2011, Camou was ranked by ESPN as the 20th most influential person in World Rugby. Camou was also involved in France’s successful bid to host the 2023 Rugby World Cup.

References

1945 births
2018 deaths
Rugby union people in France
French rugby union players
Presidents of the French Rugby Federation